Shuen Wan Lei Uk is a village in Tai Po District, Hong Kong.

Administration
Shuen Wan Lei Uk is one of the villages represented within the Tai Po Rural Committee. For electoral purposes, Shuen Wan Lei Uk is part of the Shuen Wan constituency, which was formerly represented by So Tat-leung until October 2021.

Shuen Wan Lei Uk is a recognized village under the New Territories Small House Policy.

See also
 Plover Cove

References

External links

 Delineation of area of existing village Shuen Wan Lei Uk (Tai Po) for election of resident representative (2019 to 2022)

Villages in Tai Po District, Hong Kong